Debreceni Vasutas Sport Club, commonly abbreviated DVSC, is a Hungarian women's handball club from Debrecen, that plays in the Nemzeti Bajnokság I.

Since August 2018 they are sponsored by Schaeffler Group, so the official name for the team is DVSC Schaeffler.

History
Nicknamed Loki, the team was founded in 1948 as a department of the multi-sports club Debreceni VSC. Seven years later, they have won their first ever Hungarian championship title after beating two of their three opponents in the championship final, including title holders Csepeli SK. However, this achievement remained the lone success of the club for a long time, after they got relegated in 1959 and spent the subsequent twenty years in the second division.

Promoted back in 1979, their brightest period came under the management of Ákos Komáromi, between the late eighties and mid-nineties, during which time they won the Hungarian championship, five Hungarian cups, and two consecutive EHF Cups. The latter one is an exceptional success; no other teams have ever defended their title in the EHF Cup.

In the following years, the club lost many of their key players and their financial options narrowed as well, which resulted a significant setback. The team was on the brink of bankruptcy, when András Gellén, a businessman and die-hard DVSC fan took over the club in May 2009.

Gellén had his own conception, that built solely on Hungarian players and promoted the youngsters. To fulfil the club's long-term plans, he also invested into a new arena for the handball academy, which was finished in January 2011 and cost around €1.4 million.

In the second part of 2011, however, DVSC faced a heavy financial crisis as Gellén could not pay the wages, and as a result, many of the first team players left. Gellén eventually sold his 63.3% share to the city of Debrecen for a nominal fee of 10 Hungarian Forint, that now owns 96.4% of the club. The city worked out a long-term project, which similarly to the club's former intention wants to build on home-grown players. The budget in the first season is expected to be around 100 million Forint (approximately €330,000), which may grow to 150–180 million (€500,000–600,000) in the coming years to ensure Debrecen to achieve a podium finish and to qualify to a European cup again. Balázs Makray took the chairman duties, who faced the similar situation in 1999 when he took over the local football club, and for the 2000s he made Debreceni VSC one of the dominant team in the Hungarian league.

Crest, colours, supporters

Kit manufacturers and Shirt sponsor
The following table shows in detail Debreceni VSC kit manufacturers and shirt sponsors by year:

Kits

Team

Current squad
Squad for the 2022–23 season

 Head coach: Zoltán Szilágyi
 Assistant and goalkeeping coach: Grega Karpan
 Masseur: Attila Kazsimér

Goalkeepers
 12  Vanessa Torda
 16  Ann-Cathrin Giegerich
 94  Catherine Gabriel
Wingers
RW
 28  Alexandra Töpfner
 88  Mariana Costa
LW
 24  Míra Vámos
 71  Mirtill Petrus
Line players
 13  Petra Füzi-Tóvizi
 18  Réka Bordás

Back players
LB
 22  Jovana Jovović 
 44  Gréta Kácsor
 77  Krisztina Anna Panyi
 92  Dóra Hornyák 
CB
 25  Liliána Csernyánszki
 38  Petra Vámos
 81  Nina Szabó
RB
 5  Konszuéla Hámori
 43  Szimonetta Planéta

Transfers
Transfers for the 2023–24 season

 Joining
  Gabrijela Bartulović (GK) (from  Dunaújvárosi Kohász KA)
  Kata Juhász (LP) (from  Nemzeti Kézilabda Akadémia)
  Vivien Grosch (RW) (from  MTK Budapest)
  Elinore Johansson (RB) (from  Storhamar HE)

 Leaving
  Ann-Cathrin Giegerich (GK) (to  ŽRK Budućnost Podgorica)
  Réka Bordás (LP) (to  Ferencvárosi TC) ?
  Mariana Costa (RW)

Honours

Domestic competitions
Nemzeti Bajnokság I (National Championship of Hungary)
 Champions (2): 1955, 1987
 Runners-up (8): 1985, 1988–89, 1989–90, 1993–94, 1994–95, 1995–96, 2009–10, 2010–11
 Third place (5): 1986, 1990–91, 1992–93, 2008–09, 2021–22

Magyar Kupa (National Cup of Hungary)
 Winners (5): 1985, 1987, 1988-1989, 1989–90, 1990–91
 Finalists (7): 1983, 1986, 1988, 1995–96, 2000–01, 2008–09, 2010–11, 2020-21

European competitions
EHF Cup Winners' Cup
Runners-up (2): 1989–90, 1991–92

EHF Cup
Winners (2): 1994–95, 1995–96
Runners-up (1): 1993–94
Semifinalists: 2005-06

Recent seasons

Seasons in Nemzeti Bajnokság I: 37
Seasons in Nemzeti Bajnokság I/B: 5
Seasons in Nemzeti Bajnokság II: 15

In European competition

Participations in Champions League (Champions Cup): 3x
Participations in EHF European League (IHF Cup, EHF Cup): 19x
Participations in Challenge Cup (City Cup): 1x
Participations in Cup Winners' Cup (IHF Cup Winners' Cup): 9x

Records

Most league appearances

Top league goalscorers

Notable players 

  Amália Sterbinszky
  Katalin Szilágyi
  Gabriella Szűcs
  Annamária Bogdanović
  Beatrix Benyáts
  Viktória Csáki
  Anna Szántó
  Zsuzsa Nagy
  Éva Arany
  Erika Csapó
  Ilona Eperjesi
  Mária Jeddi †
  Bettina Pásztor
  Rózsa Tóth
  Anasztázia Virincsik
  Éva Kiss
  Valéria Szabó
  Ivett Nagy
  Viktória Soós
  Anett Sopronyi
  Anita Kazai
  Gabriella Juhász
  Petra Madai
  Rita Borbás
  Rita Borók
  Hortenzia Szrnka
  Bernadett Temes
  Melinda Pastrovics
  Mária Tóth
  Renáta Mörtel
  Ágnes Triffa
  Anita Bulath
  Viktória Oguntoye
  Barbara Pálos-Bognár
  Mária Barkasziné Szász
  Irina Szamozvanova
  Tetyana Shynkarenko
  Tetyana Vorozhtsova
 Karyna Yezhykava
  Lotte Grigel
 Anna Punko
 Maria Khakunova
 Daniela Crap
 Madalina Zamfirescu
 Michaela Galai
 Alina Marin
 Dagmar Stuparičová
 Janka Caltíková
 Lucia Uhraková
 Alžbeta Tóthová
 Verica Nikolic
 Nada Micic
 Marijana Trbojevic
 Ruta Latakaite
 Arna Sif Palsdottir
 Bobana Klikovac
 Deonise Fachinello
 Juliana Borges Lima
 Ivana Lovric

Coaches 
 Ferenc Bokor (1950–1968)
 Ferenc Kapitány (1970–1971)
 Ferenc Halász (1975–1980)
 Géza Szász (1980)
 István Varga (1981)
 János Szentgyörgyi (1981)
 Dusan Szlancso (1990–1991)
 Ákos Komáromi (1982-1990, 1991-1994, 1997-1998, 2000, 2002-2003)
 Csaba Árva (1997)
 Sándor Medgyessy (2000-2001)
 Sándor Váczi (2001-2002)
 Zoltán Balogh (2003-2004)
 László Laurencz (2004–2005)
  Imre Bíró (1999-2000, 2005–2007, 2012–2013)
  Botond Bakó (2008-2010)
 József Varga (2004, 2007-2008, 2013-2015)
 Vilmos Köstner (1994-1996, 1998-1999, 2010–2012, 2018-2021)
 Tone Tiselj (2016-2018)
 Gergő Vida (2018)
 Pal Oldrup Jensen (2018)
 Kitti Kudor (2021)
 Zoltán Szilágyi (2021-)

See also
 Debreceni VSC

References

External links
 Official website 
 

 
Hungarian handball clubs
Handball clubs established in 1948
Sports clubs in Debrecen
1948 establishments in Hungary
Debreceni VSC